Pekka Kupiainen (born 25 November 1929) was a Finnish footballer. He played in six matches for the Finland national football team from 1953 to 1955. He was also part of Finland's team for their qualification matches for the 1954 FIFA World Cup. He played 3 seasons in Mestaruussarja with Jäntevä Kotka. He played 52 games and scored 2 goals. He also played two seasons in Suomensarja.

References

External links
 

1929 births
Possibly living people
Finnish footballers
Finland international footballers
Place of birth missing (living people)
Association footballers not categorized by position